Sir Samuel Lewis  (13 November 1843 – 9 July 1903) was a Sierra Leonean Krio mayor of Freetown and lawyer. Lewis was the first West African ever knighted and was the third Sierra Leonean to qualify as a barrister. Lewis was the first mayor of Freetown after the Freetown Municipal Council was established. In 1896, he was made a knight, the first West African to achieve such an honour, a year after he had been appointed mayor.

Background
Lewis was one of nine children (eight sons and a daughter) of a Yoruba Recaptive merchant (in real estate and agricultural products) Elderman William Lewis of Oxford Street in the Freetown Municipal Council, and his wife Fanny. His siblings - Ebenezer Albert, Christopher Bright Lewis, William Jr, John, Josiah William, Emmanuel, Jacob and Caroline Matilda Lumpkin - were all political leaders and heads of the colonial government of Freetown. His parents were both liberated Africans from Egba in south western Nigeria.  Lewis travelled to England by way of the relationship between his father William and the captain of a merchant ship that was shipping goods from Freetown to England. He is buried in Acton Cemetery in West London, England.

Political career and legal luminary
Lewis went to England in 1866. He entered the Middle Temple, and then the chambers of Samuel Danks Waddy. He moved on to a chancery chambers, and was called to the bar in 1871. He returned to Freetown in 1872.

Lewis and other Eldermen who formed the Freetown Municipal Council were able to convince the Colonial Government with civil protest to relinquish power and the day-to-day running of the Municipal Council by Black Africans. In 1882, he was elected as a member to the American Philosophical Society.

Sources
 Short biographies of Sierra Leonean 'heroes'

Notes

1843 births
1903 deaths
People from Freetown
Sierra Leone Creole people
Mayors of Freetown
Sierra Leonean knights
Knights Commander of the Order of St Michael and St George
People educated at the Sierra Leone Grammar School
Sierra Leone Colony and Protectorate judges